The Essential Bob Dylan is a compilation by Bob Dylan, released in 2000 as the inaugural entry in Sony Music's "The Essential" double-disc compilation series. The Essential Bob Dylan spans from 1963's "Blowin' in the Wind" (from The Freewheelin' Bob Dylan) to 2000's "Things Have Changed" (Dylan's Oscar-winning song from the motion picture Wonder Boys).

The Essential Bob Dylan has proven to be a solid seller in Dylan's catalog, reaching No. 67 in the US and peaking at No. 9 in the UK.

The British and Australian releases include all of the tracks from the US edition plus several more. It has been reissued in 2009 and 2016 with varying track listings.

Track listings
All songs written by Bob Dylan except where noted.

Standard track listing

British and Australian track listing

2010 version

2014 version

2016 vinyl version

Charts

Certifications

References 

2000 greatest hits albums
Albums produced by Tom Wilson (record producer)
Albums produced by Mark Knopfler
Albums produced by Daniel Lanois
Albums produced by Bob Johnston
Albums produced by John Hammond (producer)
Albums produced by Jerry Wexler
Bob Dylan compilation albums
Columbia Records compilation albums
Albums produced by Leon Russell
Albums produced by Don DeVito
Albums produced by Barry Beckett
Albums produced by Bob Dylan